Ashok Kalyanrao Tapkir  ( – 10 December 2019) was an Indian politician from Maharashtra belonging to Indian National Congress. He was a legislator of the Maharashtra Legislative Assembly.

Biography
Tapkir was elected as a legislator of the Maharashtra Legislative Assembly from Haveli in 1985 as an Indian National Congress candidate.

Tapkir died on 10 December 2019 at the age of 70.

References

1940s births
2019 deaths
Indian National Congress politicians from Maharashtra
Members of the Maharashtra Legislative Assembly
People from Pune district